Clinton Killough (born June 11, 1993) is an American football coach who is the head football coach at Incarnate Word.

Playing career
Killough grew up in San Antonio, Texas and attended Douglas MacArthur High School. He was the Brahmas starting quarterback for three seasons. Killough was named first-team All-District 26-5A as a senior after passing for 2,273 yards and 31 touchdowns while also rushing for 743 yards and 11 touchdowns. He initially committed to play college football at Texas Tech as a preferred walk-on and move to wide receiver. Killough ultimately enrolled at Texas State, where he redshirted his true freshman season before transferring to the University of the Incarnate Word. Over three seasons playing for the Cardinals he caught 54 passes for 692 yards and two touchdowns. His 90-yard touchdown reception on September 28, 2013, vs. Eastern New Mexico still stands as the longest touchdown from scrimmage in Cardinal history.

Coaching career
Killough began his coaching career as a graduate assistant at Bowling Green in 2017, where he worked with defensive backs and special teams. After one season he returned to Incarnate Word as an offensive quality control coach. Killough was promoted to inside wide receivers coach and added duties as the Cardinals' recruiting coordinator in 2020. He was briefly the interim head coach after the 2021 season when head coach Eric Morris left UIW to become the offensive coordinator at Washington State. Killough was elevated to wide receivers coach and named associate head coach by new head coach G. J. Kinne. He was hired as Incarnate Word's head coach on December 15, 2022, to replace Kinne after he was hired as the head coach at Texas State.

Head coaching record

References

External links
Incarnate Word Cardinals player bio
Incarnate Word Cardinals coach bio

1993 births
Living people
Incarnate Word Cardinals football players
Bowling Green Falcons football coaches
Incarnate Word Cardinals football coaches
Sportspeople from San Antonio